Ignacio Vidal may refer to:

Ignacio Vidal-Folch (born 1956), Spanish writer
Nacho Vidal (born 1973), Spanish pornographic actor
Nacho Vidal (footballer) (born 1995), Spanish footballer